Deep Bay is a designated place in the Canadian province of Newfoundland and Labrador.

Geography 
Deep Bay is in Newfoundland within the Town of Fogo Island in Division No. 8.

Demographics 

See also 
List of communities in Newfoundland and Labrador
List of designated places in Newfoundland and Labrador

References

External links 
Folklore and Oral History collection from Deep Bay

Designated places in Newfoundland and Labrador